The Port Vila Grand Mosque is a mosque in Port Vila, the capital of Vanuatu.

History 
The mosque had been established and completed in 1992 by the Mele Muslims. It was also the first mosque built in Vanuatu.

See also 
 Islam in Vanuatu
 Hohola Mosque
 Al-Khadeejah Mosque

References 

1992 establishments in Vanuatu
Port Vila
Islam in Vanuatu
Mosques completed in 1992
Mosques in Oceania